Sofiya Nikolayevna Lisovskaia (1876–1951) was a Russian Empire and Soviet physician known for her prolific research in immunology and urology. She was the first Russian woman - Professor of Urology and the founder of the Urology Chair at the First Leningrad Medical Institute (currently, First Pavlov State Medical University of St. Peterburg). She headed the chair for 28 years (1923-1951).

Education
She studied at the Petersburg Women's Medical Institute and earned her medical degree in 1911.

Career
In 1917, she organized the First Leningrad Medical Institute (her alma mater, renamed after the Russian Revolution) the Privatdozent courses on urology at the Chair of operative surgery headed by Professor A.A. Kadyan (1849-1917).

In 1923, her courses were reorganized into an independent Chair that she headed until her death.

She published 86 papers throughout her career, including her doctoral thesis on thyroid transplantation, an immunological technique for diagnosing gonorrhea, and applications of classical conditioning to the treatment of enuresis (bladder incontinence). Her book "Триппер и методы борьбы с ним" ("Gonorrhea and the methods of fighting it") was first published in 1926 and had six consecutive editions.

During World War II, she worked in the besieged Leningrad.

References 

Women physicians from the Russian Empire
Soviet immunologists
Soviet urologists
Physicians from Saint Petersburg
1876 births
1951 deaths
20th-century women physicians
Physicians from the Russian Empire
Soviet women physicians